José Luis Uribarri Grenouillou (9 August 1936 – 23 July 2012) was a Spanish television presenter and director for TVE. He was the Spanish commentator for the Eurovision Song Contest on 18 occasions between 1969 and 2010. He was widely known as La voz de Eurovisión (The Voice of Eurovision) in Spain.

Biography

Early career
Uribarri was born in Ávila. After finishing school at Marist school in Palencia, he went on to study law but left in 1956 to work as a radio speaker for Radio Juventud, and then for Radio Intercontinental.

He debuted in Televisión Española (TVE) in 1958 when he participated in the contest for new talents Caras nuevas, hosted by Blanca Álvarez. He was hired by TVE and established himself as one of the most popular presenters in Spain. He won a Premios Ondas in 1966. One of hist most successful shows was the musical programme Aplauso, which he directed and hosted between 1978 and 1983.

Eurovision Song Contest
In 1968, Spain won the Eurovision Song Contest for the first time in London with Massiel's "La, la, la", which meant Spain would host the 1969 Contest. Regular Spanish Commentator until then was Federico Gallo, but Uribarri took over the job, which he continued at the 1970 Contest. Uribarri returned as the Spanish commentator between the 1974 and the 1976 Contests. After an hiatus between 1977 and 1991, he returned as commentator at the 1992 Contest and continued in the job until the 2003 Contest, which cemented his status as the voice of Eurovision. He made returns again for the 2008 and the 2010 Contest.

Other than the Contest itself, Uribarri presented the Spanish national final Pasaporte a Dublín for the 1971 Contest. In 1998, he directed and wrote the four-episode documentary series Eurovisión Siglo XX, which focused on the history of the Eurovision Song Contest. In 2000 and 2001, he directed Spanish national finals Eurocanción 2000 and Eurocanción 2001. He also made appearances as a member of the jury in Spanish national finals. In 2009 he headed the jury at Spanish national final Eurovisión 2009: El retorno, and he was a member of the Spanish jury as well at the Eurovision Song Contest 2009.

Late career 
In November 2010 Uribarri began working for Catholic-oriented television channel 13 TV hosting film programme Nuestro Cine. As a result, it was confirmed on 8 February 2011 that Uribarri would not return to provide the Spanish commentary for the 2011 Contest, as he stated that he wanted to concentrate on his projects for 13 TV. It was announced on 2 March of that year that José María Íñigo would fulfill the role as Spanish commentator.

Death
Uribarri suffered a cerebral hemorrhage on 18 July 2012. He died on 23 July 2012 in a hospital in Madrid.  He was 75.

References

External links

 Biography of José Luis Uribarri

1936 births
2012 deaths
Spanish Roman Catholics
Spanish television presenters
Spanish television personalities
Spain in the Eurovision Song Contest
People from Ávila, Spain